Sizerock is an unincorporated community in Leslie County, Kentucky, United States. Sizerock had a post office with ZIP code 41762 that closed in 1964.

References

Unincorporated communities in Leslie County, Kentucky
Unincorporated communities in Kentucky